Central-North Commercial Historic District is a national historic district located at St. Joseph, Missouri. The district encompasses 18 contributing buildings in an industrial / commercial section of St. Joseph west of the central business district. It developed between about 1885 and 1929, and includes representative examples of Italianate and Classical Revival style architecture. Located in the district is the separately listed John D. Richardson Dry Goods Company. Other notable buildings include a number of warehouse / light manufacturing facilities some of which were designed by the architectural firm of  Eckel & Aldrich.

It was listed on the National Register of Historic Places in 1991.

References

Historic districts on the National Register of Historic Places in Missouri
Italianate architecture in Missouri
Neoclassical architecture in Missouri
Historic districts in St. Joseph, Missouri
National Register of Historic Places in Buchanan County, Missouri